Arlo Adolph Brunsberg (born August 15, 1940) is an American former professional baseball player. He signed with Detroit after graduating from Concordia College (Moorhead, Minnesota), where he starred in baseball, football and basketball.

Brunsberg's MLB "cup of coffee" occurred at the end of his fifth season in the Tiger farm system. In his second and last big-league game, on the closing day of the Tigers' 1966 campaign, he registered his only hit in the majors, a double off eventual Baseball Hall of Famer Catfish Hunter.

After his playing career, Brunsberg spent three years, 1971–1973, as head baseball coach at North Dakota State University, then three decades as a teacher and high school baseball coach in Blaine, Minnesota.

References

External links

1940 births
Living people
Baseball coaches from Minnesota
Baseball players from Minnesota
College baseball coaches
Columbus Jets players
Concordia Cobbers baseball players
Concordia Cobbers football players
Concordia Cobbers men's basketball players
Detroit Tigers players
Duluth-Superior Dukes players
Knoxville Smokies players
Major League Baseball catchers
Montgomery Rebels players
North Dakota State Bison baseball coaches
People from Polk County, Minnesota
Rochester Red Wings players
Syracuse Chiefs players
Thomasville Tigers players
Toledo Mud Hens players